Piper Creek is a creek in Red Deer, Alberta that flows into Waskasoo Creek. It carries the drainage from a shallow lake in Red Deer to an intersection with Waskasoo Creek.

See also 
 List of rivers of Alberta

Rivers of Alberta
Red Deer, Alberta